Pedro Pablo Velasco Arboleda (born 29 June 1993), is an Ecuadorian football defender currently playing for Barcelona SC in the Ecuadorian Serie A.

Club career

Velasco joined Barcelona in January 2013 from Deportivo Quito. In his first season with Barcelona he scored two goals out of 25 league games.

International career
He was named in Ecuador's senior squad for a 2018 FIFA World Cup qualifier against Peru in September 2016.

References

1993 births
Living people
Sportspeople from Esmeraldas, Ecuador
Association football fullbacks
Ecuadorian footballers
Barcelona S.C. footballers
S.D. Quito footballers
Ecuador international footballers
2019 Copa América players